Sierra Madera crater is a meteorite crater (astrobleme) in southwestern Pecos County, Texas, United States. The peak is visible from U.S. Highway 385 between Fort Stockton, Texas and Marathon, Texas. The Sierra Madera crater is located on private property on the La Escalera Ranch.

Apollo 17's Gene Cernan and Jack Schmitt did some of their geologic training here.

See also
Odessa Meteor Crater
Marquez crater
Barringer Meteor Crater, Arizona
Trans-Pecos
Pecos River
Llano Estacado

References

External links
Geology of the Sierra Madera cryptoexplosion structure, Pecos County, Texas, Professional Paper 599- H, By: H.G. Wilshire, T.W. Offield, K.A. Howard, and David Cummings. 1972.

Impact craters of the United States
Cretaceous impact craters
Landforms of Pecos County, Texas